Beer and Revolution: The German Anarchist Movement in New York City, 1880–1914  is a 2007 history book by Tom Goyens following the lives of German immigrant radicals in New York City.

References

Further reading

External links 

 
 Pre-release paper from the author

2007 non-fiction books
Anarchism in New York (state)
Books about anarchism
English-language books
History books about anarchism
University of Illinois Press books
German-American culture in New York City